Yangshupu Road is a station on Shanghai Metro Line 4. It is located along Dalian Road at its intersection with Yangshupu Road, in the Yangpu District of Shanghai, and is the first station on Line 4 in Puxi travelling counter-clockwise after crossing the Huangpu River from Pudong. Service began at this station on 31 December 2005.

Nearby places
 Jingxing Road Mosque

References

Shanghai Metro stations in Yangpu District
Line 4, Shanghai Metro
Railway stations in China opened in 2005
Railway stations in Shanghai